Saturday Night Live is an American sketch comedy series created and produced by Lorne Michaels for most of the show's run. The show has aired on NBC since 1975.

2020–2021 season

The 46th season of Saturday Night Live premiered on October 3, 2020, with host Chris Rock and musical guest Megan Thee Stallion, and concluded on May 22, 2021, with host Anya Taylor-Joy and musical guest Lil Nas X.

On September 15, 2020, it was announced that the entire cast from last season will return, with Ego Nwodim being promoted to repertory status[6], while Chloe Fineman and Bowen Yang, both of whom had been hired in 2019 for the previous season, remained as featured players.

The next day brought the announcement of three new cast members: SNL writer/stand-up comic Andrew Dismukes, L.A. Upright Citizens Brigade alum Lauren Holt, and stand-up comedian Punkie Johnson, the show's second African-American lesbian cast member after Danitra Vance from the 1985–1986 season.

Though not members of the cast, it was announced the same day that Alec Baldwin and Maya Rudolph would reprise their respective roles as Donald Trump and Kamala Harris, while Jim Carrey would take over impersonating Joe Biden. Biden had been portrayed by Jason Sudeikis while he was vice president and by Woody Harrelson, John Mulaney, and Sudeikis the previous season. On December 19, Carrey announced he would step down from playing Biden, stating it was the original intention that he would play Biden for only six weeks. Then-current cast member Alex Moffat succeeded Carrey to portray as Biden during the cold open of the episode hosted by Kristen Wiig.

Cecily Strong was absent from the first six episodes of the season due to filming commitments for her Apple TV+ series Schmigadoon!. Aidy Bryant appeared in the season premiere before taking an extended absence due to filming commitments for her show Shrill.

This was the final season for longtime cast member Beck Bennett, who had been on the show since 2013, a total of 8 seasons. It was also Holt's only season on the show, as she was let go after the finale.

Repertory players
 Beck Bennett
 Aidy Bryant
 Michael Che
 Pete Davidson
 Mikey Day
 Heidi Gardner
 Colin Jost
 Kate McKinnon
 Alex Moffat
 Kyle Mooney
 Ego Nwodim
 Chris Redd
 Cecily Strong
 Kenan Thompson
 Melissa Villaseñor

Featured players
 Andrew Dismukes
 Chloe Fineman
 Lauren Holt
 Punkie Johnson
 Bowen Yang

2021–2022 season 

The 47th season of Saturday Night Live premiered on October 2, 2021 with host Owen Wilson and musical guest Kacey Musgraves, and concluded on May 21, 2022 with host Natasha Lyonne and musical guest Japanese Breakfast. 

On September 27, 2021, five days before the season premiere, it was announced that Beck Bennett and Lauren Holt had both left the show. Bennett had been part of the cast since 2013, while Holt had been in for just Season 46. The rest of the cast from the previous season was retained. Three new featured players were added: actor/comedian and filmmaker Aristotle Athari, impressionist James Austin Johnson, and surrealist comedian Sarah Sherman. Chloe Fineman and Bowen Yang, who had been with the cast since Season 45, were both promoted to repertory status, while Andrew Dismukes and Punkie Johnson, who joined the previous season, remained as featured players.

This was the final season for Kate McKinnon and Aidy Bryant, who both had been cast members since 2012, Kyle Mooney who had been a cast member since 2013, and Pete Davidson, who had been with the cast since 2014.

On September 1, 2022, it was announced that Melissa Villaseñor, Alex Moffat (both previously cast members since 2016) and Athari (who only lasted one season) would also not be returning for Season 48, and then on September 19, 2022, it was announced that Chris Redd (a cast member since 2017) was also exiting the show.

Repertory players
 Aidy Bryant
 Michael Che
 Pete Davidson
 Mikey Day
 Chloe Fineman
 Heidi Gardner
 Colin Jost
 Kate McKinnon
 Alex Moffat
 Kyle Mooney
 Ego Nwodim
 Chris Redd
 Cecily Strong
 Kenan Thompson
 Melissa Villaseñor
 Bowen Yang

Featured players
 Aristotle Athari
 Andrew Dismukes
 James Austin Johnson
 Punkie Johnson
 Sarah Sherman

2022–2023 season 

The 48th season of Saturday Night Live premiered on October 1, 2022, with host Miles Teller and musical guest Kendrick Lamar. Before the start of the season, eight cast members (Aristotle Athari, Aidy Bryant, Pete Davidson, Kate McKinnon, Alex Moffat, Kyle Mooney, Chris Redd, Melissa Villaseñor) had all left the show. In addition, executive producer Lorne Michaels called this season a "transition year", and revealed that 4 new cast members will be joining the show this season. Three days later, those four cast members were announced as Marcello Hernandez, Molly Kearney, Michael Longfellow, and Devon Walker. Andrew Dismukes and Punkie Johnson, who had been cast members since 2020, were promoted to repertory players, while James Austin Johnson and Sarah Sherman, who joined the previous season, remained as featured players. Cecily Strong was absent from the first three episodes of the season due to her commitments to the Los Angeles revival of The Search for Signs of Intelligent Life in the Universe, and returned for the October 29, 2022 episode.  Strong would later leave the show altogether in mid-December, her final episode airing on December 17, 2022.

Repertory players
 Michael Che
 Mikey Day
 Andrew Dismukes
 Chloe Fineman
 Heidi Gardner
 Punkie Johnson
 Colin Jost
 Ego Nwodim
 Cecily Strong  (final episode: December 17, 2022)
 Kenan Thompson
 Bowen Yang

Featured players
 Marcello Hernandez
 James Austin Johnson
 Molly Kearney
 Michael Longfellow 
 Sarah Sherman
 Devon Walker

References

2020
2020s in American television
Saturday Night Live in the 2020s